A constitutional referendum was held in French Somaliland on 5 May 1946 as part of the wider French constitutional referendum. The proposed new constitution was rejected by 60% of voters in the territory, and 53% of voters overall.

Results

References

1946 referendums
Referendums in Djibouti
1946 in French Somaliland
Constitutional referendums in France
May 1946 events in Africa